Vyškovce nad Ipľom is a village and municipality in the Levice District in the Nitra Region of Slovakia.

History
In historical records the village was first mentioned in 1156, whilst the castle was mentioned first in 1296, when Andrew III of Hungary confiscated it from the sons of Jakab Cseszneky because of the disloyalty of the Csesznekys and donated the castle to János (Csák's son) of the clan Csák. Later the  Koháry, Esterházy, Forgách, and Breuner families were the most important landlords in the village.

Geography
The village lies at an altitude of 123 metres and covers an area of 19.295 km². It has a population of about 695 people.

Ethnicity
The village is approximately 80% Magyar and 20% Slovak.

Facilities
The village has a public library and football pitch.

External links
https://web.archive.org/web/20080111223415/http://www.statistics.sk/mosmis/eng/run.html 

Villages and municipalities in Levice District